Igginbottom was an English progressive rock band, formed in Bradford West Riding of Yorkshire in 1968, featuring Steven Robinson (guitar), Allan Holdsworth (guitar, vocals), Dave Freeman (drums) and Mick Skelly (bass). They were managed by a company called Mimo, which was owned by Mick Jackson (also of Bradford), Mo Bacon, Morgan Fisher (all members of the band Love Affair at the time), Ronnie Scott and his business partner Pete King. Their only album, 'Igginbottom's Wrench, was released in 1969 on the Deram label.

References

Jazz fusion ensembles
English progressive rock groups
Musical groups established in 1969